USS Whitecap (SP-340) was a United States Navy patrol vessel in commission from 1917 to 1919.
 
Whitecap was built in 1916 as a commercial fishing trawler of the same name by Manitowoc Shipbuilding Company at Manitowoc, Wisconsin. The U.S. Navy acquired Whitecap from the Bay State Fisheries Company of South Boston, Massachusetts, on 28 April 1917 for World War I service as a patrol vessel, and commissioned her as USS Whitecap (SP-340) on 8 May 1917.

Initially attached to the 1st Naval District in northern New England, Whitecap began operations out of the 2nd Naval District in southern New England in late February 1918. During her naval career, Whitecap operated primarily out of Newport, Rhode Island, patrolling between that base and New London, Connecticut. Occasionally, her coastal patrols took her to Nantucket Island off Massachusetts, Block Island off Rhode Island, and Montauk Point, Long Island, New York, as well as to New York City. When not at sea keeping tabs on the coastwise traffic of naval and merchant vessels, Whitecap performed local tow and escort service out of Newport.

Decommissioned at Boston, Massachusetts, on 11 March 1919, Whitecap was returned to the Bay State Fisheries Company on 1 April 1919. Her name was struck from the Navy List, and Whitecap resumed her peacetime fishing pursuits

References

Department of the Navy Naval Historical Center Online Library of Selected Images: U.S. Navy Ships: USS Whitecap (SP-340), 1917-1919
NavSource Onlline: Section Patrol Craft Photo Archive Whitecap (SP 340)

World War I patrol vessels of the United States
Patrol vessels of the United States Navy
Ships built in Manitowoc, Wisconsin
1916 ships